The AN/APG-65 and AN/APG-73 are designations for a family of all-weather multimode airborne radar systems designed by Hughes Aircraft (now Raytheon) for the F/A-18 Hornet, and used on a variety of fighter aircraft types. The APG-79 is an upgraded AESA version.

These I band (8 to 12 GHz) pulse-Doppler radar systems are designed for both air-to-air and air-to-surface missions. For air-to-air operations they incorporate a variety of search, track and track-while-scan modes to give the pilot a complete look-down/shoot-down capability. Air-to-surface modes include Doppler beam sharpened sector and patch mapping, medium range synthetic aperture radar, fixed and moving ground target track and sea surface search. In the F/A-18, the radar is installed in a slide-out nose rack to facilitate maintenance.

AN/APG-65 

The APG-65 was developed in the late 1970s and has been operational since 1983. The radar includes a velocity search (to provide maximum detection range capability against nose aspect targets), range-while-search (to detect all-aspect targets), track-while-scan (which, when combined with an autonomous missile such as AIM-120, gives the aircraft a fire-and-forget capability), single target track, gun director and raid assessment (which enables the operator to expand the region centred on a single tracked target, permitting radar separation of closely spaced targets) operating modes.

Although no longer in production, the APG-65 remains in service in F/A-18 Hornet strike fighters of the U.S. Navy and Marine Corps, and the air forces of Canada, Kuwait, and Spain. It has also been adapted to upgrade the German and Greek F-4 Phantom aircraft, and the AV-8B Harrier II Plus for the U.S. Marine Corps and the Spanish and Italian Navies.

AN/APG-73 
The APG-73 is a late 1980s "upgrade of the APG-65 that provides higher throughputs, greater memory capacity, improved reliability, and easier maintenance". To reduce production costs, many of the upgraded radar's modules are common with the APG-70 (F-15E Strike Eagle) radar; its software engineers chose the JOVIAL programming language so that they could borrow and adapt existing software written for the APG-70. When fitted with a motion-sensing subsystem and stretch waveform generator and special test equipment, the APG-73 can generate high resolution ground maps and make use of 'advanced' image correlation algorithms to enhance weapon designation accuracy.

Since 1992 the APG-73 has been operational in U.S. Navy and Marine Corps F/A-18C and D aircraft; early models of the U.S. Navy F/A-18E/F Super Hornet; and in the air forces of Finland, Switzerland, Malaysia, Canada, and Australia. A total of 932 APG-73 systems were delivered, with the final delivery in 2006.

References 

Aircraft radars
Hughes Aircraft Company
Raytheon Company products
Military radars of the United States
Synthetic aperture radar
Military equipment introduced in the 1980s